Gabriella Natalie Charlton is a reality television personality and actress who works in Tamil-language television and film. She has appeared on the reality dance television series Jodi Junior and appeared on the sixth season of Jodi Number One, which she won. In 2020, she was a contestant on the fourth season of the reality series Bigg Boss Tamil.

Career 
Gabriella began her career in television at the age of nine, by appearing in Jodi Junior, a dance reality show broadcast on STAR Vijay. She also appeared as Gaby in 7aam Vaguppu C Pirivu, a Tamil soap opera about school children, that aired on STAR Vijay. She also appeared on the sixth season of Star Vijay's reality dance series Jodi Number One, which she won.

Gabriella Charlton appeared as Sumi in the romantic thriller film 3, and later as Riya in Chennaiyil Oru Naal. She also portrayed Rashitha in Appa. She was a finalist in Bigg Boss Season 4. And currently in Eeramana Rojaave 2 as a main lead

Filmography

Television

References

External links 
 

Living people
Indian film actresses
Actresses in Tamil cinema
21st-century Indian actresses
Bigg Boss (Tamil TV series) contestants
Actresses in Tamil television
Year of birth missing (living people)
Place of birth missing (living people)